Floris van Imhoff (born 21 January 1964, Wassenaar) is a former Dutch curler.
Now coaching the Praxis Hammerheads, he has curled in 12 European Curling Championships.  He skipped the Dutch team four times (1996, 1997, 1998, 2003). On top of 12 years of European Curling Championship experience, van Imhoff was the third for Wim Neeleman at the 1994 World Curling Championship. They finished a respectful 7th place.

External links

Floris van Imhoff - Praxis Hammerheads
Competitieschild - MijnDenHaag
Hammerheads website

1964 births
Living people
Dutch male curlers
People from Wassenaar
Sportspeople from South Holland